KRCH ("Laser 101.7") is a radio station owned by iHeartMedia (formerly Clear Channel Communications) which broadcasts from Rochester, Minnesota. It has a classic rock format. headquartered in Rochester MN

"Laser 101.7" Morning Show (1993–1999)
Prior to broadcasting the syndicated Bob and Tom Show on weekday mornings, KRCH aired a locally produced morning show hosted by Matt and Homey.

References

External links
Laser 101.7

Radio stations in Minnesota
Classic rock radio stations in the United States
Radio stations established in 1996
IHeartMedia radio stations